Chelluri Jaikumar (born 11 April 1961) is an Indian former cricketer. He played thirteen first-class matches for Hyderabad between 1989 and 1992.

See also
 List of Hyderabad cricketers

References

External links
 

1961 births
Living people
Indian cricketers
Hyderabad cricketers
People from Beed district